Villers-Guislain is a commune in the Nord department in northern France. The graveyard at  Gauche Wood contains the casualties who died during the Battle of Épehy when British troops were deployed between Gouzeaucourt and Villers-Guislain.

Heraldry

See also
Communes of the Nord department

References

Villersguislain